

The CAB GY-30 Supercab was a two-seat light aircraft built in France in 1954, as a further development of the CAB Minicab.  The design was performed by Yves Gardan, a onetime employee of French aeronautical company SIPA. Changes incorporated in the Supercab (from the Minicab) included a more powerful engine, greater wingspan, manually retractable undercarriage, and slotted flaps that replaced the split flaps of the Minicab.

Seven units were constructed by CAB before the rights to the design were sold to Gardan's former employer (SIPA), who developed the design into the SIPA 1000.  However, due to a downturn in the light aircraft market at that time, only three of the SIPA variant were produced before production was halted.

Specifications

Notes

References

 
 
 CAB Supercab on aviafrance.com
 Website of the Association des Proprietaires et Amateurs d'Avions Gardan

1950s French sport aircraft
Supercab
Single-engined tractor aircraft
Low-wing aircraft
Aircraft first flown in 1954